Let 'em Roll is an album by American organist Big John Patton recorded in 1965 and released on the Blue Note label.

Reception

The AllMusic review by Thom Jurek awarded the album 5 stars and stated "This is one of the least appreciated of Patton's records, and there's no reason for it; it is great".

Track listing
All compositions by John Patton except where noted
 "Let 'em Roll" – 6:48
 "Latona" – 7:23
 "The Shadow of Your Smile" (Johnny Mandel, Paul Francis Webster) – 6:55
 "The Turnaround" (Hank Mobley) – 6:49
 "Jakey" – 5:37
 "One Step Ahead" – 6:26

Personnel
Big John Patton – organ
Bobby Hutcherson – vibes
Grant Green – guitar
Otis Finch – drums

References

Blue Note Records albums
John Patton (musician) albums
1966 albums
Albums recorded at Van Gelder Studio
Albums produced by Alfred Lion